"Babacar" is a 1987 song recorded by French singer France Gall. Written by Michel Berger, it was the first single from the album of the same name. Released on 3 April 1987, it reached the top 20 in France and West Germany.

All copyright revenue was donated to the family of Babacar (a little boy in Africa, Babacar Sall, whom they got to know on one of their vacations).

Track listings
 7-inch single
 "Babacar" – 4:42
 "C'est bon que tu sois là" – 3:39

Charts

Kate Ryan version

It was announced by Kate Ryan in early 2009 that her new single would be a French track and a cover. Later on, at the end of May, the single cover was released and it was confirmed that it would be another France Gall cover.
Ryan performed and presented the single for the first time in her gig at G-A-Y in London, United Kingdom.
Later, a preview of the official video was onlineone week before the Belgian release of the single.
The song debuted first in Sweden at No. 27, debuting one week after in Belgium at No. 22.
The song was already released in Poland and the Czech Republic and a German release was set for 30 October 2009.

Track listings
 CD single
 "Babacar" (radio edit) — 3.11
 "Babacar" (extended mix) — 5.18

 CD maxi
 "Babacar" (radio edit) – 3:21
 "Babacar" (extended) – 5:21
 "Babacar" (basto! remix) – 6:33
 "Babacar" (XTM remix) – 6:34

Charts

Other cover versions
In 2009, the song was covered by Lara Fabian on her eighth studio album Toutes les femmes en moi, as 14th track.

References

1987 singles
2009 singles
France Gall songs
Kate Ryan songs
Songs about children
Songs about Africa
Songs written by Michel Berger
1987 songs
Song recordings produced by Michel Berger
Warner Music Group singles